Jacob Andersson (born March 17, 1995) is a Swedish professional ice hockey defenceman. He is currently playing with IF Björklöven in the HockeyAllsvenskan (Allsv).

Playing career
Andersson made his Swedish Hockey League debut playing with Skellefteå AIK during the 2014–15 SHL season.

In the 2021–22 season, Andersson recorded 20 assists through 57 games in the Liiga with Ässät. On 12 May 2022, Andersson was signed for a second stint with Swedish Allsvenskan club, IF Björklöven, agreeing to a two-year contract.

References

External links

1995 births
Living people
Asplöven HC players
Ässät players
IF Björklöven players
Skellefteå AIK players
Swedish ice hockey defencemen
VIK Västerås HK players
Sportspeople from Umeå